Santiago Bueras is an underground metro station on the Line 5 of the Santiago Metro, in Santiago, Chile. It is named after Santiago Bueras, a soldier shot dead at the Battle of Maipú. The station was opened on 3 February 2011 as part of the extension of the line from Pudahuel to Plaza de Maipú.

The station consists of a mined platform tunnel and transept, as well as a cut-and-cover shaft. There is an inverted pyramid roof over the paid area of the street-level ticket hall, which features V-shaped pillars and glazed walls.

References

Santiago Metro stations
Railway stations opened in 2011
Santiago Metro Line 5